Iman Shiraz Futsal Club was an Iranian professional futsal club based in Shiraz.

History 

On 22 October 2020, the officials of Iman established the club by buying the points of Labaniyat Arjan, which was on the verge of bankruptcy, and participated in the 2020–21 Iranian Futsal Super League. Iman Shiraz Club was dissolved on 2 January 2022 after financial problems and its points were transferred to Heyat Football Darab Club.

Season-by-season 
The table below chronicles the achievements of the Club in various competitions.

Last updated: July 8, 2021

Notes:
* unofficial titles
1 worst title in history of club

Key

P   = Played
W   = Games won
D   = Games drawn
L   = Games lost

GF  = Goals for
GA  = Goals against
Pts = Points
Pos = Final position

Managers

Last updated: July 8, 2021

References 

Futsal clubs in Iran
Sport in Shiraz
2020 establishments in Iran